Guillaume Hendrik "Chick" Weijzen (born 21 January 1935, Maastricht) is a Dutch sprint canoer who competed in the early to mid-1960s. Competing in two Summer Olympics, he earned his best finish of seventh in the K-4 1000 m event at Tokyo in 1964.

Weijzen's son, Marc, competed in canoeing for the Netherlands at the 1992 Summer Olympics in Barcelona.

References
Sports-reference.com profile

1935 births
Living people
Canoeists at the 1960 Summer Olympics
Canoeists at the 1964 Summer Olympics
Dutch male canoeists
Olympic canoeists of the Netherlands
Sportspeople from Maastricht